The Galpin GTR1 (sometimes referred to as the Galpin Ford GTR1) is a custom sports car based on the Ford GT developed and built by American automotive company Galpin Auto Sports. The car was unveiled at Pebble Beach in 2013. Galpin planned to make at least six cars in 2014, with the possibility of another 18 to follow, based on demand.

Specifications
In 2013, Galpin Auto Sports utilized the mechanical underpinnings of a Ford GT as basis to build the GTR1. The hand-built, all-aluminum chassis features carbon fiber detailing, and LED headlights, and is approximately  wider than the standard Ford GT. The interior is only slightly altered from the Ford GT, but now has leather upholstery, a machined aluminum instrument cluster, and a McIntosh audio system. The GTR1 uses 20" aluminum wheels, which are fitted with Pirelli P-Zero tires. Carbon fiber disc brakes, with six-piston calipers and Reinforced carbon–carbon rotors are used to stop the car. It is the only car in the world, besides Formula One cars, to have carbon-carbon rotors.

References

External links

Sports cars
Rear mid-engine, rear-wheel-drive vehicles
Ford vehicles
Cars introduced in 2013